is a former Japanese football player and manager. He played for, and then managed, the Japanese national team.

Club career
Yokoyama was born in Saitama on January 21, 1943. After graduating from Kawaguchi High School and Rikkyo University, he joined his local club Mitsubishi Motors in 1966. He played as regular goalkeeper from first season and played all matches in Japan Soccer League until 1974. In 1975, he was deprived of regular goalkeeper by Mitsuhisa Taguchi. The club won the league champions 2 times (1969 and 1973) and 2nd place 6 times. The club also won 1971 and 1973 Emperor's Cup. He retired in 1977. He played 136 games in the league. He was selected Best Eleven 7 times.

National team career
In October 1964, when Yokoyama was a Rikkyo University student, he was selected Japan national team for 1964 Summer Olympics in Tokyo. At this competition, he debuted and played all matches on behalf of Tsukasa Hosaka fractured his hand just before Olympics. After that, Yokoyama became a regular goalkeeper at Japan national team. In 1968, he was selected Japan for 1968 Summer Olympics in Mexico City. He played all matches and Japan won bronze medal. In 2018, this team was selected Japan Football Hall of Fame. He also played at 1966, 1970 and 1974 Asian Games. He played 49 games for Japan until 1974.

Coaching career
In 1976, when Yokoyama played for Mitsubishi Motors (later Urawa Reds), he became a playing manager as Hiroshi Ninomiya successor. In 1978, the club won all three major titles in Japan; Japan Soccer League, JSL Cup and Emperor's Cup. It was first domestic treble for a Japanese club. The club also won 1980 Emperor's Cup, 1981 JSL Cup and 1982 Japan Soccer League. He resigned in 1984. In 1988, he became a manager for Japan national team as Yoshinobu Ishii successor, where he coached Japan in the country's first competitive tournament, the 1988 AFC Asian Cup. At 1990 World Cup qualification in 1989, Japan lost in First round. Although Yokoyama managed at 1990 Asian Games, he resigned in 1991. In 1994, he became a manager for Urawa Reds as Takaji Mori successor. However, the club finished at the bottom in J1 League and he resigned end of season. In 1995, he became a general manager. From October 2000, he managed the club. In 2002, he resigned as general manager.

In 2005, Yokoyama was selected Japan Football Hall of Fame.

Club statistics

National team statistics

Managerial statistics

Awards
 Japan Soccer League Best Eleven: (7) 1966, 1967, 1968, 1969, 1971, 1973, 1974

References

External links
 
 
 Japan National Football Team Database
 
 Japan Football Hall of Fame at Japan Football Association
Japan Football Hall of Fame (Japan team at 1968 Olympics) at Japan Football Association
 

1943 births
Living people
Rikkyo University alumni
Association football people from Saitama Prefecture
Japanese footballers
Japan international footballers
Japan Soccer League players
Urawa Red Diamonds players
Olympic footballers of Japan
Olympic bronze medalists for Japan
Olympic medalists in football
Medalists at the 1968 Summer Olympics
Footballers at the 1964 Summer Olympics
Footballers at the 1968 Summer Olympics
Asian Games medalists in football
Asian Games bronze medalists for Japan
Footballers at the 1966 Asian Games
Footballers at the 1970 Asian Games
Footballers at the 1974 Asian Games
Association football goalkeepers
Japanese football managers
Japan national football team managers
J1 League managers
Urawa Red Diamonds managers
1988 AFC Asian Cup managers
Medalists at the 1966 Asian Games